The 2008 Europe Cup in badminton was the 31st edition of the Europe Cup. It was held between June 11 and June 15, 2008, in the Borisoglebsky Sports Centre, in Ramenskoye, Russia.

Results

References
Badminton Europe: 2008 Europe Cup

External links
Official website
TournamentSoftware: Europe Cup 2008

Europe Cup (badminton)
Europe Cup
B
Badminton
2008 in Russian sport
Europe Cup